Martin L. Beck was an architect, artist, and professor of architecture.

Biography
 Undergraduate work at Royal Institute of Technology, Budapest, Hungary
 Pratt Institute, Brooklyn, New York, 1922–23
 Graduate College, School of Architecture, Princeton University (1927–28), as winner of scholarship award in national competition.

Academic career
He was appointed to the Princeton University faculty as Assistant Professor of Architecture in 1928, and through 1942  taught courses in Architectural Design, Theory and Elements of Construction, Descriptive Geometry, Mechanical Drawing, etc.  He was also appointed Lecturer in Education 1966, New York University, for Course and seminars in "School Plant Planning, Maintenance and Operation".  He simultaneously carried on a professional practice.

References

 
 
 

Year of birth missing
Place of birth missing
20th-century American architects
Pratt Institute alumni
Princeton University School of Architecture alumni
Princeton University faculty
New York University faculty